The Supreme Appellate Court Gilgit-Baltistan is the highest court of appeal in the region of Gilgit Baltistan, Pakistan. It consists of a Chief Justice and two other Judges.
The Court was established in 2009 under Gilgit-Baltistan (Empowerment and Self Governance Order) 2009 and has the similar jurisdiction equal to the Supreme Court of Pakistan.
The Permanent Seat of the Court is at Gilgit, but the Court also sits from time to time at Skardu Branch Registry.

The appointment of the Chairmen and Members on September 27, 2005, marked the beginning of the Court's operations. Due to changes made to the Northern Areas Governance order of 1994, the court's nomenclature was changed on December 15 to Northern Areas Supreme Appellate Court. Original and appellate jurisdiction were also granted, and the court was given status equal to the Supreme Court of Azad Jammu and Kashmir. Gilgit-Baltistan Empowerment and Self Governance Order 2009, which was published on September 9th, also gave the Supreme Appellate Court the same jurisdiction as the Supreme Court of Pakistan.

Court composition 
Under Gilgit-Baltistan Empowerment and Self-Governance Order 2009 Gilgit-Baltistan Supreme Appellate Court was established with a Chief Justice and two other Judges. The chief judge and judges are appointed for a period of three years by the prime minister of Pakistan. There is a fixed number of justices at 3 and, as of current, there are currently 2 judges and one Chief Justice in Supreme Appellate Court Gilgit-Baltistan.

Chief Justice of GB and justices

Former Judges

Former Chief Justice 
 Justice Qazi Ehsanullah Qureshi (2005-2008)
 Justice Muhammad Nawaz Abbasi (2009-2012)
 Justice Rana Muhammad Arshad (2012-2015)
 Justice Rana Muhammad Shamim (2015-2018)
 Justice Syed Arshad Hussain Shah(2019-2022)

Former Judges 
 Justice Altaf Hussain (2005-2008)
 Justice Syed Tahir Ali Shah (2005-2008)
 Justice Syed Jaffar Shah (2009-2012)
 Justice Muhammad Yaqoob Khan (2009-2012)
 Justice Raja Jalal-ud-Din (2013-2016)
 Justice Muzaffar Ali (2013-2016)
 Justice Shehbaz Khan (15-3-16 to 20-9-2016)

Jurisdiction 
According to Articles 75, 76, 80, & 92 of the Government of Gilgit-Baltistan Order, 2018, the Supreme Appellate Court has the authority to decide cases in its original, appellate, review, and advisory jurisdictions.

Original jurisdiction 
Without limiting the provisions of section 86, the Supreme Appellate Court shall have the authority to issue a declaratory order of the kind described in said section if it determines that a matter involving the enforcement of any fundamental right granted by Chapter I of Part II of this Order is one of general public importance. A Bench made up of at least two judges, to be appointed by the Chief Judge, shall hear an application made pursuant to subsection (1).

Review jurisdiction 
Subject to the terms of an Act of the Assembly and any rules made by the Supreme Appellate Court, the Supreme Appellate Court shall have the authority to review any decision made or order issued by it.

Advisory jurisdiction 
The Supreme Appellate Court of Gilgit-Baltistan may be consulted on any legal issue that the Prime Minister or Governor deems to be of public importance at any time. The prime minister or governor may submit the issue for consideration to the court. The prime minister or, as the case may be, the governor will receive a report from the Gilgit-Baltistan Supreme Appellate Court on any question that has been so referred.

See also 
 Gilgit-Baltistan Chief Court
 Supreme Court of Pakistan
 Gilgit-Baltistan Legislative Assembly
 Gilgit-Baltistan Council

References

External links
 Introduction

Judiciary of Gilgit-Baltistan
2009 establishments in Pakistan
Courts and tribunals established in 2009